The Bachelor of Computer Science (abbreviated BCompSc or BCS) is a bachelor's degree awarded by some universities for completion of an undergraduate program in computer science. In general, computer science degree programs emphasize the mathematical and theoretical foundations of computing.

Typical requirements 
Because computer science is a wide field, courses required to earn a bachelor of computer science degree vary. A typical list of course requirements includes topics such as:
 Computer programming 
 Programming paradigms
 Algorithms
 Data structures 
 Logic & Computation
 Computer architecture
 
Some schools may place more emphasis on mathematics and require additional courses such as:
 Linear algebra
 Calculus
 Probability theory and statistics
 Combinatorics and discrete mathematics
 Differential calculus and mathematics

Beyond the basic set of computer science courses, students can typically choose additional courses from a variety of different fields, such as:
 Theory of computation
 Operating systems
 Numerical computation
 Compilers, compiler design
 Real-time computing
 Distributed systems
 Computer networking
 Data communication
 Computer graphics
 Artificial intelligence
 Human-computer interaction
 Information theory
 Software testing
 Information assurance

Some schools allow students to specialize in a certain area of computer science.

Related degrees
 Bachelor of Software Engineering
 Bachelor of Science in Information Technology
 Bachelor of Computing
 Bachelor of Information Technology
 Bachelor of Computer Information Systems

See also
 Computer science
 Computer science and engineering

References

Computer Science
Computer science education
Computer science educators